Vlad the Drac Returns is a book by Ann Jungman, and the sequel to Vlad the Drac. It was first published in 1984 by Dragon Books.

References

British children's novels
Vampire novels
1984 British novels
1984 children's books
Children's fantasy novels